Eocoracias is an extinct genus of bird related to modern rollers and other Coraciiformes such as kingfishers, bee-eaters, motmots, and todies. It contains one species, Eocoracias brachyptera, and it lived approximately 47 million years ago (Lutetian stage) based on dating of the fossil site. It is known for a specimen having preserved non-iridescent structural coloration on its feathers, previously unknown in fossil birds. Fossils have been found at the Messel Pit in Germany.

References 

Eocene birds
Coraciiformes
Paleogene birds of Europe
Prehistoric bird genera
Fossil taxa described in 2000